Ballachulish House is a restaurant located in Ballachulish, Highland, Scotland. , the restaurant holds one star in the Michelin Guide.

References

Restaurants in Scotland
Michelin Guide starred restaurants in the United Kingdom
Companies based in Highland (council area)
Lochaber